Time of troubles can refer to:

a general period in Arnold J. Toynbee's model of the lifecycle of civilizations (see A Study of History)
Time of Troubles, a particular period in early 17th-century Russian history